Craig Mountain is a  mountain summit located in Wallowa County, Oregon, US.

Description

Craig Mountain is located 10 miles south of Joseph, Oregon, in the Wallowa Mountains. It is set within the Eagle Cap Wilderness on land managed by Wallowa–Whitman National Forest. The mountain is situated one-half mile southeast of Ice Lake and two miles east of Matterhorn. The peak ranks as the 33rd-highest summit in Oregon. Precipitation runoff from the mountain drains to the West Fork of the Wallowa River. This landform's toponym has been officially adopted by the United States Board on Geographic Names.

Climate

Based on the Köppen climate classification, Craig Mountain is located in a subarctic climate zone characterized by long, usually very cold winters, and mild summers. Winter temperatures can drop below −10 °F with wind chill factors below −20 °F. Most precipitation in the area is caused by orographic lift. Thunderstorms are common in the summer.

Gallery

See also
 List of mountain peaks of Oregon

References

External links

 Weather forecast: Craig Mountain

Mountains of Oregon
Mountains of Wallowa County, Oregon
North American 2000 m summits
Wallowa–Whitman National Forest